The 2010 Asian Games torch relay was held from October 12, 2010 through 21 cities in Guangdong province and 2 cities outside the province before the opening ceremony on November 12, 2010. Prior to the relay, a lighting ceremony was held back on October 9, 2010. Some 2,068 torchbearers were expected to carry the torch with one of the relay was held in indoor arena. The relay in Harbin was held in the main venue of the 1996 Asian Winter Games, the Harbin Ice Hockey Rink, while the relay on October 22, 2010 was affected by Typhoon Megi as it was held under the rain. The relay from November 6–8 acted as a demonstration relay. The flame travelled across China aboard a China Southern Airlines Airbus A330-200 named "Flight Guangzhou 2010" (Registration B-6057), with the airline company being the official partner of the games.

Torch
Two torch designs were short-listed in September 2009 for the 2010 Asian Games. "The Tide" was chosen by the organisers as the torch of the Games, defeating the "Exploit" design. The Tide weighs 98 g and is 70 cm long, and is tall and straight in shape, while dynamic in terms of image. The secondary official mark of the torch relay was unveiled on July 15, 2010, featuring a silhouette of a running goat holding a torch.

Lighting ceremony
On October 9, 2010, the flame lighting ceremony was held at the Juyongguan at the Great Wall of China in Beijing. A 22-year-old Yunnan Arts University student Kang Chen-chen was chosen to light the torch. The condition at the time of the lighting was foggy, while she tried to light the torch with a solar mirror with little sunlight. Therefore, it took upwards of 2 minutes before the torch flame could come up. Kang received quite a bit of media attention afterwards. Most of it praised the way she handled the situation. The cauldron was then lit-up by president Hu Jintao.

Route

See also
2008 Summer Olympics torch relay route
2009 East Asian Games torch relay

References

Torch Relay, 2010 Asian Games
Asian Games torch relays